Red Mountain may refer to:

Places

Canada
 Red Mountain (British Columbia), the highest summit in the Camelsfoot Range in British Columbia
 Red Mountain (Rossland), a mountain near Rossland, British Columbia
 Red Mountain Resort, a ski resort on Red Mountain in Rossland, also known as Red Resort
 Mount Price (British Columbia), a volcano in British Columbia formerly known as Red Mountain
 Fissile Peak, a mountain in British Columbia formerly known as Red Mountain

 Red Mountain Creek, a tributary of Ashlu Creek in British Columbia

China
 Hong Shan, a symbolic inner city mountain in Ürümqi, Xinjiang
 Kizilto (meaning 'red mountain'), Akto County, Kizilsu Kyrgyz Autonomous Region, Xinjiang

Czech Republic
 see Červená hora (disambiguation)

United States
 Red Mountain (Birmingham), Jefferson County, Alabama
 Red Mountain (Coconino County, Arizona), located in the Coconino National Forest of northern Arizona
 Mount McDowell, located in Maricopa County, Arizona
 Red Mountain Freeway, a part of Loop 202 in Metropolitan Phoenix, Arizona, named for the mountain
 Red Mountain, California, an unincorporated community in San Bernardino County
 Red Mountain (Santa Clara County, California), a mountain in the Diablo Range
 Red Mountain (Costilla County, Colorado), a mountain in the Culebra Range of southern Colorado
 Red Mountain (El Paso County, Colorado), by Manitou Springs, Colorado
 Red Mountain (Grand County, Colorado), a mount in the Never Summer Mountains of Rocky Mountain National Park in Colorado
 Red Mountain (Ouray County, Colorado), a mount in the San Juan Mountains of Colorado
 Red Mountain Pass (San Juan Mountains), a mountain pass in Colorado associated with the mountain
 Red Mountain (Fergus County, Montana), a mountain in Fergus County, Montana
 Red Mountain (Gallatin County, Montana), a mountain in Gallatin County, Montana
 Red Mountain (Glacier County, Montana)
 Red Mountain (Lewis and Clark County, Montana), a mountain in Lewis and Clark County, Montana
 Red Mountain (Sweet Grass County, Montana), a mountain in Sweet Grass County, Montana
 Red Mountain (Nevada), see Nellis Air Force Base Complex
 Red Mountain (New York), an elevation
 Red Mountain (Oregon), a summit of the Wallowa Mountains
 Red Mountain (Benton County, Washington)
 Red Mountain (King County, Washington), in King County north of Snoqualmie Pass
 Red Mountain (Kittitas County, Washington), Washington
 Red Mountain (Skagit County, Washington), in North Cascades National Park
 Red Mountain AVA, a wine region in Washington named for the mountain
 Red Mountain (Wyoming), located in the northern Teton Range

Other uses
Red Mountain (band), an American string band taking its name from Red Mountain (Birmingham, Alabama)
 Red Mountain (film), a 1951 Western starring Alan Ladd
Red Mountain, a place in the video game The Elder Scrolls III: Morrowind
Red Mountain, later Carlo Rossi Red Mountain, a one-gallon jug of cheap wine, from E & J Gallo Winery
红山 (disambiguation)